Groove On is the second studio album by Gerald Levert. It was released by EastWest Records on September 6, 1994, in the United States. The follow-up to Levert's debut album, Private Line (1991), it reached number two on the US Top R&B/Hip-Hop Albums and number 18 on the US Billboard 200. The first single from the album was the David Foster produced "I'd Give Anything", a cover of the 1993 song that was originally recorded by short lived country music group Boy Howdy. It was Levert's second top 40 crossover hit. The music video for the second single "How Many Times" was directed by actress Jada Pinkett. Two more singles included "Can't Help Myself" and "Answering Service".

Track listing

Personnel
Edwin "Tony" Nicholas, Marc Gordon, Dwain Mitchell, Greg Charley, Troy Patterson, Michael Goods, Claude Gaudette - drum programming
Edwin "Tony" Nicholas, Marc Gordon, David Foster, Greg Charley, Troy Patterson, Michael Goods - keyboards
Simon Franglen - Synclavier programming
Claude Gaudette, Tony Smith - synthesizer programming
Michael Thompson, Randy Bowland - guitar
Gerald Levert, Gerard Labeaud, James Labeaud, Christopher Kelly, Richard Chatman, Warren Wiebe - backing vocals
Technical
 Recording engineer: Craig Carruth, Jim Salamone, Michael Tarsia, Ron A. Shaffer, Gordon Rice, Paul Smith, Pete Tokar, Arthur Stoppe, Mark DeMartini, Dave Reitzas
 Mixing: Andy Kravitz, Michael Tarsia, Gordon Rice, Paul Smith, Mick Guzauski, Greg Charley, John Winston, Troy Patterson
 Mastering: Ted Jensen
 Photography: Ruven Afanador
 Art direction, Design: Elizabeth Barrett

Charts

Weekly charts

Year-end charts

Certifications

References

1994 albums
Gerald Levert albums
Albums produced by David Foster
East West Records albums